Lushlife (born 1981) is an American rapper and record producer.

Lushlife may also refer to:

 Lushlife (album), a 2000 album by Bowery Electric
 "Lushlife", a song by Baboon from We Sing and Play

See also
 Lush Life (disambiguation)